is a Japanese former professional baseball player (infielder) and currently the hitting coach for the Orix Buffaloes of Nippon Professional Baseball (NPB). He is a native of Edogawa, Tokyo, Japan.

See also 
 Matsuzaka Generation

References

External links 
 KOYANO EIICHI OFFICIAL WEB SITE-

NPB

1980 births
Living people
Japanese baseball players
People from Edogawa, Tokyo
Nippon Professional Baseball infielders
Nippon Ham Fighters players
Hokkaido Nippon-Ham Fighters players
Orix Buffaloes players
Japanese baseball coaches
Nippon Professional Baseball coaches